The Church of Jesus Christ of Latter-day Saints in Idaho refers to the Church of Jesus Christ of Latter-day Saints (LDS Church) and its members in Idaho. Rexburg, Idaho is home to Brigham Young University–Idaho. Idaho has the third most church members of any U.S. state (after Utah and California), and the second-highest percentage of members (after Utah). The LDS Church is the largest denomination in Idaho, with the largest presence in Eastern Idaho.

History

The LDS Church first came to Idaho in 1855 when Brigham Young sent pioneers to settle the area. Early settlements were in Franklin, Bear Lake Valley, and south central Idaho. Idaho became a state in 1890 and Latter-day Saints comprised one-fifth of the population. Church presidents Harold B. Lee, Ezra Taft Benson, and Howard W. Hunter were all natives of the state.

County statistics
List of LDS Church adherents in each county as of 2010 according to the Association of Religion Data Archives: Note: Each county adherent count reflects meetinghouse location of congregation and not location of residence. Census count reflects location of residence, which may skew percent of population where adherents reside in a different county than their congregational meetinghouse.

Missions

In addition to these, the Utah Ogden Mission covers parts of southeastern Idaho, and the Washington Spokane Mission covers northern Idaho.

 In 2016, all four missions in the state had drastic changes made to their boundaries. Before the boundary changes the four missions were as listed: the Boise, Nampa, Pocatello, and Twin Falls missions. As a result of the boundary changes the Twin Falls mission was renamed to the Idaho Falls mission. The Boise mission was effectively cut in half, with the stakes in Eagle, Star, and Meridian transferred to the Nampa mission. The Boise mission lost a lot of territory on the west, but gained much more on the east by taking in the stakes that cover the Twin Falls, Burley and Rupert regions. The Nampa mission did not lose any ground, but gained a lot from the Boise mission, with the Meridian Idaho Temple within the mission's boundaries. The Twin Falls mission no longer exists. The Twin Falls, Rupert, and Burley regions were taken into the Boise mission, and the north east regions near Salmon were taken into the new Idaho Falls mission. The new Idaho Falls mission is headquartered in Idaho Falls. It will take in the Salmon region of the old Twin Falls mission, and take in the Rexburg and Idaho Falls regions of the Pocatello mission. The Pocatello mission was basically cut in half. The Rexburg, and Idaho Falls regions were taken into the new Idaho Falls mission. The changes were made in an attempt to make it easier for the full-time missionaries to work effectively with local church members. These changes were made as of July 1, 2016.

The Idaho Nampa and Idaho Twin Falls missions, which were created on July 1, 2013, were discontinued in 2019.

Temples

Following the dedication of the Pocatello Temple in 2021, there are six LDS temples in Idaho. On April 4, 2021, Russell M. Nelson announced that a new temple will be built in Burley. In October of that year, Nelson announced the intent to build a second temple in Rexburg.

Communities 
Latter-day Saints have had a significant role in establishing and settling communities within the "Mormon Corridor", including the following in Idaho:

 Ammon
 Blackfoot
 Chesterfield
 Idaho Falls
 Malad City
 Malta
 Mud Lake
 Oneida County
 Paris
 Pocatello
 Rexburg
 Sugar City
 Woodruff

See also

Religion in Idaho
The Church of Jesus Christ of Latter-day Saints membership statistics (United States)
Davis v. Beason

References

Further reading
 .

External links
 Newsroom (Idaho)
 ComeUntoChrist.org Latter-day Saints visitor site
 The Church of Jesus Christ of Latter-day Saints official site